The Church of St. Sebastian is a former Roman Catholic parish church under the authority of the Roman Catholic Archdiocese of New York, located at 312 East 24th Street in Manhattan, New York City. The parish was established in 1921 and staffed by the Franciscan Friars; it was suppressed in 1971.

See also
List of churches in the Roman Catholic Archdiocese of New York

References 

Christian organizations established in 1921
Closed churches in the Roman Catholic Archdiocese of New York
Closed churches in New York City
Roman Catholic churches in Manhattan
1921 establishments in New York City
Organizations disestablished in 1971